Eigil Sørensen (born 24 June 1948) is a former Danish cyclist. He competed in the individual road race at the 1972 Summer Olympics.

References

External links
 

1948 births
Living people
Danish male cyclists
Olympic cyclists of Denmark
Cyclists at the 1972 Summer Olympics
Sportspeople from the Region of Southern Denmark